SNK Arcade Classics Vol. 1 is a video game compilation created and published by SNK which includes sixteen Neo Geo games. The compilation was released on the PlayStation 2, PlayStation Portable, and the Wii. In Australia, it was only released on the PlayStation 2.

A sequel was released in Japan titled SNK Arcade Classics 0. The reason for the title having a ‘0’ is because the games in this collection predate the Neo Geo AES console.

Games included

All titles are modified to work with the in-game medal system as well as on-screen controls.

SNK Arcade Classics 0

Reception

IGN gave the Wii version a 7.2 out of 10. They applauded the high value for money (roughly $2 per game), the inclusion of achievements, the short load times and limited slowdown compared to the PlayStation 2 and PSP versions, the selection of four control schemes which all work very well, the inclusion of multiplayer modes in most of the games, and the diversity of game genres offered. Their one criticism was the locking of move lists. GameSpot gave it a 6 out of 10. Like IGN, they criticized the locking of move lists; unlike them, they argued that of the four available control schemes, only the Classic Controller functions competently for all the games. However, their main complaint was that of the 16 games, only Last Resort and Metal Slug are worth getting, with the remaining 14 games being "middling to bad".

References

External links
 Official SNK website

2008 video games
Neo Geo games
SNK Playmore games
Wii games
PlayStation 2 games
PlayStation Portable games
SNK game compilations
Video games developed in the United States
Terminal Reality games
Multiplayer and single-player video games
Cooperative video games